Smålänningen is a daily newspaper which is published five days a week (Monday to Friday) in Kronoberg County and mainly covers news in Ljungby, Markaryd, and Älmhult. The newspaper's head office is located in Ljungby, with local offices in Markaryd and Älmhult. The newspaper was founded in 1921 in Ljungby by Elfrid Dürango. The first edition was published on December 6, 1921. Since 1969 Smålänningen is a part of Hallpress. Smålänningen have a circulation of 12 200 and 34 000 readers.

1921 establishments in Sweden
Daily newspapers published in Sweden
Newspapers established in 1921
Swedish-language newspapers